David Hunter (born 5 December 1968) is a New Zealand former cricketer. He played sixteen first-class matches for Otago between 1989 and 1992. 

A former pupil of Taieri College in Mosgiel, Hunter has been the Principal of Taieri College since August 2013. He was previously Deputy 
Principal of Roxburgh Area School in Central Otago and Principal of Maniototo Area School in Ranfurly, also in Central Otago.

See also
 List of Otago representative cricketers

References

External links
 

1968 births
Living people
People educated at Taieri College
New Zealand cricketers
Otago cricketers
People from Mosgiel
Heads of schools in New Zealand